Tigranyan, or alternatively Tigranian (in Western Armenian Dikranian) is an Armenian surname, coming from the given name Tigran or Western Armenian Dikran. Notable people with the surname include:

Armen Tigranian or Tigranyan or Dikranian (1879–1950), Armenian music composer and conductor
Armen Tigranyan (born 1985), Armenian football (soccer) player
Nikoghayos Tigranian (1856–1951), Armenian composer, ethnomusicologist and pianist

Armenian-language surnames